The Reynolds-Weed House (also known as the Moore House) is a historic house located in Elkhorn, Wisconsin.   It was built as the Elkhorn Union School in 1850, then later modified.  It is locally significant as one of Elkhorn's finest examples of the Victorian/Italianate period of construction.

It was added to the National Register of Historic Places on March 31, 1983.

Its NRHP nomination describes it:  "Nearly square in dimension and symmetrical in design, the present building is a large, two-story Italianate house of built of salmon colored brick. Its broad truncated hipped roof, covered with stamped tin shingles, is intersected by center attic-level pediments above all elevations."

References

Houses in Walworth County, Wisconsin
Houses on the National Register of Historic Places in Wisconsin
Italianate architecture in Wisconsin
National Register of Historic Places in Walworth County, Wisconsin
Elkhorn, Wisconsin
Houses completed in 1850